Life of Guru Nanak Through Pictures is a book by Shamsher Singh and Narendra Singh Virdi containing a collection of forty-four janamsakhis relating events in the life of Guru Nanak. Each janamasakhi is illustrated with a full-color painting by the Punjabi artist Phulan Rani.

Published by the Modern Sahit Academy, Amritsar, in 1969, "In commemoration of Quincentenary Celebrations of Guru Nanak", it is one of the few English books about the life of Guru Nanak, and the only known fully illustrated version. The book is out of print and not widely available.

The book includes many of the well-known janamsakhis (the story of the sacred-thread ceremony, the festival at Hardawar, his visit to Mecca, etc.) as well as several of the lesser known. Inside the front cover is a map of the travels of Guru Nanak drawn from the places mentioned in the various janamsakhis, including those not mentioned in the book.

In 1970, the book was awarded "Sardar Mohan Singh Book Award" by the then President of India V. V. Giri.

References

1969 non-fiction books
Indian biographies
Sikh literature
Biographies about religious figures
20th-century Indian books